VozDiPovo-Online (Capevedean Creole (main usage) for Voice of the People) is a Capeverdean online newspaper that covers top stories from Cape Verde and is based in Aveiro, Portugal.  It serves the Capeverdean community in Portugal and has articles written in Portuguese and Capeverdean Creole and rarely English.  Its founder is Amílcar Tavares and is the current writer and editor-in chief.

Information
The main topics includes stories from other Lusophony countries (even secondary), the CPLP, the remainder of Africa at continental level, world stories and some stories from other parts of the solar system.  It also covers other topics including society, culture, economy and sports.  The newspaper are divided into sections including Cape Verde, the Forum, National football (soccer) teams, Opinion Forms, GigaVoz and the Letter's Voice.

Writers
It is written with a newspaper blog, its writers includes Amilcar Aristides Monteiro, Edson Medina, Fernando Elísio Freire, José Maria Veiga, Lamanary Pina, Luís Carlos Silva and Onuana Varelis.

See also
Newspapers in Cape Verde
List of newspapers in Portugal

External links

Newspapers published in Portugal
Aveiro, Portugal
2004 establishments in Portugal